Ein Zeitim (lit. Spring of Olives) was an agricultural settlement about 2 km north of Safed first established in 1891.

History

Ein Zeitim was founded by members of the Dorshei Zion (Seekers of Zion) society, a Zionist pioneer group from Minsk. Despite strong opposition by the Turkish government, the settlers managed to establish farms with olive groves, orchards and dairy and poultry.

Ein Zeitim was built 800m north of the Arab village Ein al-Zeitun, which had commonly been called Ein Zeitim in Hebrew and had been a mixed Arab-Jewish village during the Middle Ages.

In 1891 some speculators bought 430 hectares of land about 3 km north of Safed, and sold it to a party of laborers. Unable to work the land properly, the new owners transferred it to Baron de Rothschild, with whose assistance 750,000 vines and many fruit-trees were planted in the course of six or seven years, and during this time a number of houses were built. The population in 1898 was 51.

The village was abandoned during the first World War and only a handful of residents returned at the end of the war. The 1922 census of Palestine recorded a population of 37 inhabitants, consisting of 30 Jews and 7 Muslims. During the 1929 Palestine riots, three residents were killed and the remainder left. Six Muslims and one Jew were recorded there in 1931, living in four houses. An attempt to revive the village in 1933 failed. 

In 1946 the village was reestablished after the Jewish National Fund acquired the land. It had a population of 100 in 1947, but by the end of 1951 the population had fallen to 40. Eventually, it ceased to be populated and it became part of a military base.

References

Further reading

External links
Ein Zeitim in history

Former kibbutzim
Populated places established in 1891
Jewish villages in the Ottoman Empire
Jewish villages in Mandatory Palestine
1891 establishments in the Ottoman Empire
1929 Palestine riots